The Eaton's Ninth Floor Restaurant (known as "The Ninth Floor" or "Le 9e") is an endangered Art deco landmark in Montreal, Quebec, Canada. It ceased operation in 1999 after 68 years, and not been open to the public since. This restaurant is a registered historical site.

History
Lady Eaton, the wife of the multi-millionaire owner of the Eaton's department stores, gave her interpretation of "class and style" to the major Eaton's stores. In 1925 Eaton's purchased the three storey Goodwin building located at 677 Saint Catherine Street West and commissioned architects Ross & MacDonald to build it up to six storeys in 1927. The top three floors were added in 1930–31. On January 26, 1931 Lady Eaton opened a large art deco restaurant on the 9th floor of the building. The restaurant was designed by architect Jacques Carlu and the floor to ceiling mural at the back of the restaurant was created by his wife Natacha Carlu. It was patterned on dining hall of the transatlantic liner Ile de France. The 9th floor corridor between the elevators and restaurant is also in the art deco style.

The waitresses and loyal customers of the restaurant were the subject of a 1998 National Film Board of Canada documentary, Les Dames du 9e (The Ladies of the 9th).

Closure
Shortly following Eaton's bankruptcy, the restaurant closed on October 14, 1999. A bagpiper played "Amazing Grace" to mark its end. After remaining vacant, the 9th floor restaurant was given heritage status by the Québec government. Plans for bringing the restaurant up to modern safety standards were drawn up by Fournier, Gersovitz, Moss et associés but never implemented.

Current state and uncertain future
The former restaurant sits behind locked doors and is slowly deteriorating. The dining room, lobby and bathroom area remain, but the kitchen was demolished for office space. The current owners, Ivanhoé Cambridge, the real estate subsidiary of the Caisse de dépôt et placement du Québec, have refused in the past to allow media or preservation groups to inspect the site. Urban explorers who trespassed the site in 2004, took photographs documenting its poor condition. On February 12, 2014 Heritage Montreal announced the restaurant was "under observation" due to the building's uncertain future. Adding to the uncertainty, the former occupants of the site, Les Ailes de la Mode, went bankrupt and closed in 2014 (while now being transformed into an extension of the Montreal Eaton Centre, there are no plans for the 9th floor). Ivanhoé Cambridge last opened the floor to CTV News in 2015, though the future of the floor space remains uncertain. In September 2019 preservation advocate Gérald McNichols Tétreault launched a petition to measure public interest in reviving the space. The building's owner reported that an estimated CA$15 million would be required to bring the space up to standards suitable for public use.

See also
 Complexe Les Ailes
 The Carlu (Toronto)

References

Other sources
Anderson, Carol and Mallinson, Katharine. Lunch with Lady Eaton: Inside the Dining Rooms of a Nation, Toronto: ECW Press, 2004. 
Cohen-Rose, Sandra. Northern Deco: Art Deco Architecture in Montreal. Montreal: Corona Publishers,1996 Sandra Cohen-Rose. 
Martin, Catherine. The Ladies of the 9th Floor. 60 minute film. Winner of the 1998 Telefilm Canada prize for short and medium length films.

External links

Art Deco Montreal - Photo of the Ninth Floor Restaurant
NFB Web page for Les Dames du 9e (in French)
Close up of floor to ceiling mural
Finding aid for Ross & Macdonald Architects , Canadian Centre for Architecture
Urban Exploration Montreal - A 2004 photo and video documentation of the abandoned 9th floor

Art Deco architecture in Canada
Defunct restaurants in Montreal
Downtown Montreal
Eaton's
Landmarks in Montreal
Restaurants in Montreal